The 2001 Freightliner/G.I. Joe's 200 was a Championship Auto Racing Teams (CART) motor race held on June 24, 2001, at Portland International Raceway in Portland, Oregon, USA. It was the 8th round of the 2001 CART season. The race was won from the pole in severe wet conditions by Max Papis for Team Rahal.  Roberto Moreno finished second, and Christian Fittipaldi clinched third.

It was Papis' second career CART win and his first of the 2001 season. It was also his second career pole in the series, as well as his last. For Moreno, it was his second consecutive runner-up at Portland and his second consecutive podium that season after finishing third at Detroit. It would also be Fittipaldi's only podium finish that season.

The race was marred by heavy rain the night before the race, which created a wet track with multiple areas of standing water. This proved to be a challenge to many drivers, with the majority of them spinning at least once during the race, resulting in multiple caution periods in the first half of the race. Originally scheduled for 98 laps, the race reached the two-hour time limit after 76 laps.

Report

Background
Coming into Portland after a dominant race in Detroit, Team Penske was the favorite to control Round 8 of the 2001 season. In particular, Gil de Ferran, defending series champion and two-time defending Portland winner, was tipped to be a strong contender and perhaps even take his first win of the season. His teammate Hélio Castroneves on the other hand, having climbed the fence in Detroit after his latest victory, was also considered to be in the hunt for the win.

Going into the race, Castroneves had closed the gap to points leader Kenny Bräck in the standings, and the margin between first and second was only five points. Meanwhile, Michael Andretti had put together a streak of top-six finishes in the last four races to put himself in third in the standings. Defending champion de Ferran was sitting in a cool fifth place in the standings. Meanwhile, "Super Sub" Memo Gidley was called up to replace Nicolas Minassian in the Chip Ganassi #12 car for the rest of the season after Minassian was released by the team. Gidley had previously raced for both Forsythe Racing and Della Penna Motorsports during the 2000 CART season.

Practice and Qualifying
Practice 1 saw Kenny Bräck top the time sheets with a 58.606. Castroneves and Cristiano da Matta were the only other two drivers that session that broke into the fifty-eight second range. Other drivers, including Bräck, also used the first session to record times in their backup cars; notably, Bräck was five seconds off his session time in the backup car, whereas Alex Zanardi was able to improve his time in his backup car.

Castroneves improved on his time in previous session and led the field in Practice 2 with a time of 58.318, followed by fellow Brazilians Christian Fittipaldi and Maurício Gugelmin. This time, a total of ten drivers were able to break into the fifty-eight second range.

In the third practice session, Castroneves again led the rest of the drivers and improved his time to record a lap of 58.073, with Max Papis and da Matta closely behind. At the end of the day, the field was relatively bunched together, as nineteen drivers were able to break into the fifty-eight second range.

In qualifying, Castroneves could not convert his practice pace into a pole-winning lap, and instead Papis recorded a time of 57.785 to earn his second and final pole position in  his CART career. Da Matta slotted into second behind him, with Castroneves having to settle for third. Notably, rookie Scott Dixon was able to put his backup car in fourth place despite only running mid-field in each practice session. Dario Franchitti rounded out the top 5. Defending race winner de Ferran could only muster 15th place, less than a second behind the leader.

On the other hand, qualifying proved to be a disaster for points leader Kenny Bräck, as an exhaust system failure ignited his car and brought out the red flag to stop the session. As a result, he was given an eight-minute penalty by CART officials and could only run four laps in the backup car. When qualifying ended, Bräck only qualified 22nd out of 26 while his teammate took the pole.

Race
On raceday, rain had soaked the track for the first time since the CART teams arrived in Portland, meaning that drivers and teams alike could not rely on their practice and qualifying setups during the race itself. To make matters more difficult, the rain had continued as a light drizzle all throughout the morning warm-up and heading into the race, and CART officials decided that it was light enough to continue with the event. Portland International Raceway was already notorious for its first-turn chicane and difficulty to overtake; now drivers had to contend with a wet racetrack that nobody had practiced on all weekend.

On the pace lap, de Ferran became the first of what would ultimately be many drivers to spin off-course during the race. Going through Turn 7, de Ferran lost traction and slid into the grass, damaging his front wing and forcing him to make a pit stop.

When the green flag waved, the field was engulfed in a cloud of spray as the cars accelerated to race speed. Going into the first turn, the cars of Michael Andretti and Kenny Bräck were spun around, but they continued with no damage. Meanwhile, as the field sped down the back straightaway, Tony Kanaan went off-course at Turn 8. As he rejoined the track, he veered into the path of Memo Gidley, clipping his right rear tire and spinning him into the path of Alex Zanardi, who passing was Kanaan on the left. Zanardi and Gidley careened into the barriers, but both drivers walked away unharmed. Kanaan, meanwhile, had suffered major suspension damage, but he was able to limp back to the pits and officially retire the car.

Under the caution flag, going into Turn 7, Helio Castroneves slid off the track and nudged into the tire barriers. He was eventually restarted, but the incident put him a lap down. When the race restarted on Lap 6, the field circulated through Turn 1 cleanly with the exception of Tora Takagi and Shinji Nakano, who both spun and stalled their cars on the track. The yellow flag waved once again as both cars were restarted. After a brief caution period, the field went back to green on Lap 8. Cristiano da Matta and Max Wilson both ran wide going into the first corner, forcing them to cut the chicane. Michael Andretti also spun in Turn 1, but kept the car running. Finally, the race was stopped again when Adrian Fernández spun out later on-course and stalled the car.

Under the third caution, da Matta had too much speed going into Turn 8 and bumped the back of Papis' car, spinning himself around and stalling the car. After three caution laps, the race was again restarted on Lap 13, only to be stopped again when Bryan Herta was spun out by Wilson and stalled the car. At the same time, Alex Tagliani ran off course and punctured his right rear tire but kept the car running. After a single caution lap, the field continued under the green flag. The 15th lap of the race was the first to be incident-free, and after four cautions twelve of the twenty-six starters had spun off-track. By this time, Paul Tracy had muscled his way from 13th to 2nd and was catching up to Papis in the lead. However, after only four laps, the caution came again when Takagi spun and stalled his car a second time.

Under this fifth caution, Tracy used the opportunity to psychologically intimidate Papis by pulling alongside and tailgating him for several laps. However, Papis was able to pull away when the green flag came out again on Lap 24, but the field again only made it through a few corners before Michel Jourdain Jr. spun off course coming out of Turn 1, forcing a sixth caution. When the green came out again after one lap, Andretti was given a drive-through penalty for passing under yellow. Again Papis pulled away from the field and mounted a sizeable gap between him and Tracy in 2nd.

After several laps of green-flag running, the caution flag waved again on Lap 33 when Adrian Fernández spun off-course. The field used this opportunity to make their one and only pit stop during the race, and Papis again capitalized by leaving the pits first. At the same time, however, Paul Tracy slammed into the side of Bruno Junqueira as he left his pit box, ending Junqueira's race and damaging Tracy's suspension. Roberto Moreno took advantage of the situation and jumped both Tracy and Franchitti in the pits. Christian Fittipaldi inherited the lead by virtue of not pitting under the caution, followed by da Matta, who was now on the same strategy, and Papis in third.

When the race restarted on Lap 36, Franchitti ran into the back of Bryan Herta and spun going into Turn 1, forcing Herta and Moreno to cut the chicane. However, as Franchitti continued the race remained under green. On the same lap, Bräck and de Ferran spun in separate corners, but both were able to continue. Just a few laps later, on Lap 40, Shinji Nakano spun once again, but this time he suffered suspension damage that ended his race and brought out another caution. Fittipaldi and da Matta used this time to pit, handing the lead back to Papis.

The green flag waved again on Lap 44, but once again both Tagliani and Jourdain Jr. spun at the same corner. As the race stayed green, Paul Tracy spun coming onto the back straightaway and clipped Maurício Gugelmin, ending both of their races and bringing out the caution for what would be the 9th and final time. After three laps of caution, the green waved again and Papis took off from the rest of the field. Moreno and Wilson diced for 2nd position over the course of several laps as the rain briefly stopped before picking up again. Meanwhile, Fittipaldi began to climb up the order after restarting in 7th place. As the stretch of green-flag racing continued, the drivers who pitted on Lap 33 were told to conserve fuel to make it to the end of the race. This played into Fittipaldi's hands, as he had pitted on Lap 40 and had more than enough fuel to last the race distance.

As the race continued, race control officially declared a timed race on Lap 68, meaning that the race would only go 76 of the designated 98 laps before two hours had elapsed. By this point Fittipaldi had passed Patrick Carpentier for 4th, and was beginning to go after Wilson for a spot on the podium. With just eight minutes to go in the race, Fittipaldi cruised past Wilson going into Turn 1 and began closing on the leaders. However, after 76 laps and two hours since the drop of the green flag, Papis and Moreno were able to hold him off and take the checkered flag.

Qualifying

Race

– Includes two bonus points for leading the most laps and being the fastest qualifier.

Race statistics

Lead changes: 2 amongst 2 drivers

Standings after the race

Drivers' standings 

Constructors' standings

Manufacturer's Standings

References

G.I. Joe's 200, 2001